The Laboratory for Atmospheric and Space Physics (LASP) is a research organization at the University of Colorado Boulder. LASP is a research institute with over one hundred research scientists ranging in fields from solar influences, to Earth's and other planetary atmospherics processes, space weather, space plasma and dusty plasma physics. LASP has advanced technical capabilities specializing in designing, building, and operating spacecraft and spacecraft instruments.

History
Founded after World War II, the first scientific instruments built at LASP were launched into space using captured German V-2 rockets. To this day LASP continues a suborbital rocket program through periodic calibration instrument flights from White Sands Missile Range. It was originally called the Upper Air Laboratory, but changed to its current name in 1965. LASP has historical ties to Ball Aerospace Corporation and the Center for Astrophysics and Space Astronomy (CASA).

Facilities

LASP has two main facilities located in the University of Colorado Boulder Research Park: the LASP Space Technology Research Center (LSTR) and Space Science (SPSC). Two additional facilities - Astrophysical Research Lab (ARL) and Space Learning Lab (SLL/NPL) - are also part of LASP.

LASP's new facilities allow it to handle almost every aspect of space missions, itself. Hardware facilities allow for the construction of single instruments or entire spacecraft. A Mission Operations Center allows for the control of spacecraft data collection, and a large research staff analyzes the data.

Being part of the University, LASP has heavy student involvement in every aspect of its operations, including science, hardware design / construction and mission operations.

Satellites and instruments
LASP supports the following spacecraft and instruments:
 Galileo ultraviolet spectrometer
 Cassini-Huygens Ultraviolet Imaging Spectrograph (UVIS)
 Upper Atmosphere Research Satellite (UARS) Solar/Stellar Irradiance Comparison Experiment (SOLSTICE)
 Student Nitric Oxide Explorer (SNOE)
 Solar Radiation and Climate Experiment (SORCE)
 Ice, Cloud and Land Elevation Satellite (ICESat)
 Quick Scatterometer Mission (QuikSCAT)
 TIMED (Thermosphere Ionosphere Mesosphere Energetics and Dynamics) Solar EUV Experiment (SEE)
 MESSENGER (Mercury: Surface, Space Environment, Geochemistry, Ranging) Mercury Atmospheric and Surface Composition Spectrometer (MASCS)
 New Horizons Student Dust Counter (SDC)
 Aeronomy of Ice in the Mesosphere (AIM)
 Kepler Space Observatory
 Solar Dynamics Observatory (SDO) EUV Variability Experiment (EVE)
 Glory Total Irradiance Monitor (TIM)
 Radiation Belt Storm Probes (RBSP) Relativistic Electron Proton Telescope (REPT)
 Colorado Student Space Weather Experiment (CSSWE) CubeSat with REPT integrated little experiment (REPTile) 
 Lunar Atmosphere and Dust Environment Explorer (LADEE) Lunar Dust Experiment (LDEX)
 MAVEN - Mars Atmosphere and Volatile EvolutioN Mission
 Magnetospheric Multiscale Mission - MMS
 Miniature X-ray Solar Spectrometer (MinXSS) CubeSat
 Total Solar Irradiance Calibration Transfer Experiment (TCTE)
 GOES-R Extreme Ultra Violet and X-Ray Irradiance Sensors 
 Global-scale Observations of Limb and Disk (GOLD), a hosted payload on the SES-14 TV satellite.
 Mars Hope, Martian orbiter sponsored by the United Arab Emirates

See also

 National Center for Atmospheric Research (NCAR)
 IDL (programming language)

References

External links
 LASP official website
 Colorado Center for Lunar Dust and Atmosphere Studies

University of Colorado Boulder